This is the list of entries of the 2021 BWF World Championships qualification.

Overview

Events 
This event holds men's singles and doubles, women's singles and doubles, and mixed doubles.

Number of players/member association quota 
This event's total limit of eligibility players is 400 players, the following charts are the rules and the distribution.

Participating players

Men's singles
According to the phase 2 updated by BWF, the following table is the invitation results.

Women's singles
According to the phase 2 updated by BWF, the following table is the invitation results.

Men's doubles
According to the phase 2 updated by BWF, the following table is the invitation results.

Women's doubles
According to the phase 2 updated by BWF, the following table is the invitation results.

Mixed doubles
According to the phase 2 updated by BWF, the following table is the invitation results.

References

External links 
Official website
BWF website

Qualification
Qualification for sports events